Ganga is a 2015 Indian Kannada drama film written and directed by Sai Prakash, and produced by Ramu. The film stars Malashri in the lead role. The supporting cast features Srinivasa Murthy, Hema Chowdhary, Pavithra Lokesh, Rangayana Raghu, Suchendra Prasad, Sharath Lohitashwa. Malashri won her first Karnataka State Film Award for Best Actress for her performance in this movie.

Cast

Production
Having worked together in many successful films, with their last being the 1995 film, Gadibidi Aliya, Malashri and Sai Prakash came together for a film after 19 years with Ganga. For the film, Arjun Janya was roped in to compose the music, Anil Kumar for dialogue writing and Rajesh Katta for cinematography. The filming of Ganga began on 6 June 2014 in Bangalore.

Soundtrack

Arjun Janya composed the film's background score and music for its soundtrack, with the lyrics penned by K. Kalyan. The soundtrack album consists of two tracks.

References

2015 films
Indian drama films
Films scored by Arjun Janya
2010s Kannada-language films
Films directed by Sai Prakash